John Angelo Bagnariol (January 23, 1932 – December 6, 2009) was an American politician in the state of Washington. He served in the Washington House of Representatives from 1977 to 1981 (from 1979 to 1981, he was co-speaker with Duane Berentson). He was Speaker of the House from 1965 to 1967.

Bagnariol was convicted of racketeering charges during the FBI investigation called GAMSCAM which was looking into bribery of state officials to expand gambling operations. he was found guilty and sentenced to five years in prison. (1980)

References

2009 deaths
1932 births
Democratic Party members of the Washington House of Representatives
20th-century American politicians
Washington (state) politicians convicted of crimes